Sabah Jadoua Al-Enezi (born May 1, 1987) is a Saudi football player who plays as a midfielder . He played in the Pro League for Al-Faisaly.

External links
 

1987 births
Living people
Saudi Arabian footballers
Al Batin FC players
Al-Faisaly FC players
Al-Fayha FC players
Al-Arabi SC (Saudi Arabia) players
Al Qotah Club players
Place of birth missing (living people)
Saudi First Division League players
Saudi Professional League players
Saudi Second Division players
Saudi Fourth Division players
Association football midfielders